Ralph Chapoteau (born 1954) is a Haitian painter. He was born in Gonaïves.

Education 
Chapoteau attended the Fine Arts Academy beginning in 1974.

Career 
His work was first exhibited in 1978 and has since been displayed throughout the Caribbean, including Santo Domingo and Guadeloupe. He married with Josette Chapoteau in 2002 and have a child named Rain. Josette has extensive experience in apparel design.

Ralph Chapoteau & Josette Chapoteau created a designer fashion brand named Touta in May 2011.

References

1954 births
Haitian painters
Haitian male painters
Living people